Jordan Hill (born March 8, 1989) is a Canadian former professional ice hockey defenceman. He last played with the Toledo Walleye in the ECHL.

Playing career
Hill played major junior hockey in the Ontario Hockey League with the Sarnia Sting and Saginaw Spirit. He began his professional career with the 2009–10 season where he played two games in the American Hockey League with the Manitoba Moose.

On October 29, 2012, Hill was called up from the ECHL's Ontario Reign  to join the AHL's Bridgeport Sound Tigers, and on November 28, 2012, Hill signed on to play with the Bridgeport team for the remainder of the 2012–13 season.

Hill was invited to attend the St. John's IceCaps training camp for the 2013–14 season. On the eve of the opening night, he was signed to a one-year AHL contract with the IceCaps on October 5, 2013.

After two seasons with the IceCaps, and unable to secure an AHL contract, Hill returned to the ECHL in signing a one-year deal with the Norfolk Admirals on August 20, 2015.

As a free agent on August 5, 2016, Hill continued in the ECHL, signing a one-year deal with the Toledo Walleye. Following the 2016–17 season, Hill announced his retirement from professional hockey due to a lingering hip injury on September 4, 2017.

Career statistics

References

External links

1989 births
Living people
Bridgeport Sound Tigers players
Canadian ice hockey defencemen
Sportspeople from Sarnia
Manchester Monarchs (AHL) players
Manitoba Moose players
Norfolk Admirals (ECHL) players
Ontario Reign (ECHL) players
Ice hockey people from Ontario
Saginaw Spirit players
St. John's IceCaps players
Sarnia Sting players
Toledo Walleye players